Miriam di San Servolo (31 May 1923 – 24 May 1991) was an Italian actress, born in Rome as Maria Petacci. Her elder sister, Clara Petacci, Benito Mussolini's mistress, was executed along with their brother Marcello on 28 April 1945.

See also
 Death of Benito Mussolini

References

External links

1923 births
1991 deaths
Italian film actresses
Actresses from Rome
20th-century Italian actresses